The 2017 Toronto FC season was the 11th season in the history of Toronto FC. On June 27, 2017, Toronto FC won their sixth Canadian Championship 3–2 on aggregate over Montreal, earning them a spot in the 2018 CONCACAF Champions League. On September 30, Toronto FC won their first Supporters' Shield with a 4–2 home win over New York Red Bulls, to clinch top of the league with the most points that season. By doing so, they also became the first Canadian team to win the Supporters' Shield. In Toronto FC's last regular season match of the season on October 22, Toronto FC drew 2–2 away to Atlanta; in doing so, Toronto FC broke the MLS regular season point record with 69 points. On November 29, Toronto FC won the Eastern Conference Championship for the second year in a row, with a 1–0 aggregate win over the Columbus Crew. On December 9, 2017, Toronto defeated Seattle 2–0 in the 2017 MLS Cup final, becoming the first MLS team to complete a domestic treble, as well as the first Canadian team to win the MLS Cup.

Squad
As of December 9, 2017.

Transfers

In

Draft picks 
Draft picks are not automatically signed to the team roster. Only those who are signed to a contract will be listed as transfers in.

Out

Competitions

Preseason

Major League Soccer

League tables

Eastern Conference

Overall

Results summary

Results by round

Matches

MLS Cup Playoffs

Conference Semifinals

Conference Finals

MLS Cup

Canadian Championship

Semifinals

Final

Competitions summary

Goals and assists

Shutouts 

* Includes one shared clean sheet against Sporting Kansas City.

Disciplinary record 
Correct as of December 9, 2017

Honours

MLS Team of the Week

MLS Player of the Week

MLS Save of the Week

George Gross Memorial Trophy

End of Season awards

References

External links 
2017 Toronto FC season at Official Site

Toronto FC seasons
Toronto FC
Tor
Toronto FC
MLS Cup champion seasons
2017